The antifungal protein family is a protein family, with members sharing a structure consisting of five antiparallel beta strands which are highly twisted creating a beta barrel stabilised by four internal disulphide bridges. A cationic site adjacent to a hydrophobic stretch on the protein surface may constitute a phospholipid binding site.

Human epithelium produces antifungal proteins. The proteins kill fungi by inducing apoptosis and/or forming pores on the cell membrane.

References

Protein families